The 1965 Tour de Suisse was the 29th edition of the Tour de Suisse cycle race and was held from 10 June to 16 June 1965. The race started in Murten and finished in Bern. The race was won by Franco Bitossi of the Filotex team.

General classification

References

1965
Tour de Suisse